The Henri Poincaré University, or Nancy 1, nicknamed UHP, was a public research university located in Nancy, France. UHP was merged into University of Lorraine in 2012, and was previously a member of the Nancy-Université federation, belonging to the French Nancy-Metz academy.

History
The first University of Lorraine was created in 1572 by the Duke Charles de Lorraine and the Cardinal Charles III, in a city near Pont-à-Mousson.

Nancy 1 merged with Nancy-II, Paul Verlaine University – Metz, and the INPL forming the University of Lorraine. The merger process started in 2009 with the creation of a "pôles de recherche et d'enseignement supérieur" or PRES and was completed 1 January 2012.

International
UHP figures in the Academic Ranking of World Universities made by the Shanghai Jiao Tong University. In the year 2007, UHP ranked 305th at a worldwide scale and 124th at European scale.

Organization and administration

Components
Uhp had five Faculties:
Science and Technology
Medical School
Pharmacy
Dentistry
Sports

Three Engineering Schools:
Telecom Nancy
Polytech Nancy (formerly named ESSTIN)
ENSTIB

Three Institutes of Technology (IUT):
Nancy-Brabois
Longwy
St Dié

And one Institute for Teacher Training (IUFM).

Research
The University included a total of 44 laboratories, linked with the most important French research organizations : CNRS, INSERM, INRA and INRIA.

See also
List of public universities in France by academy

External links
Faculty of Science and Technology 
The Nancy-Université federation 

Defunct universities and colleges in France
Nancy-Université
Forestry education
Forestry in France